Candon, officially the City of Candon, is a 4th class component city in the province of Ilocos Sur, Philippines. According to the 2020 census, it has a population of 61,432 people.

Dubbed as the "Tobacco Capital of the Philippines" the city is the country's largest producer of Virginia-type tobacco.

This once small resort town is known for making the heaviest and largest kalamay, a sweet and sticky snack made from sticky rice, coconut milk and sugar, in the world. This city also has a rich historical background. In its legends, the name of the city is derived from the legendary "kandong" tree which is now but extinct in the area. Its patron saint is John of Sahagun and his feast day is celebrated every June 12.

Candon is the center of the 2nd district of Ilocos Sur. Government District offices are all located in the city. The city supports more than 100,000 citizens in terms of commercial and industrial services.

Etymology

Several theories exist about the etymology of the city. One is that the name of the city was derived from the now rare "candong" tree. It is said by locals that during Spanish times, the powerful chieftains of the area, after having a gathering called a "kaniaw," held a contest (called "gabbu," a wrestling contest) to decide the husband of Ineng, the daughter of the most powerful chieftain, Madal-ang, and his would-be successor, owing to his advancing age.  The contest was held under the shade of the candong trees, the residence of Madal-ang.  The winner was the chieftain named Kalinio, resident of the caves of Cauplasan who defeated Madal-ang and another chieftain named Abay-a from the caves of Cadanglaan. Kalinio and the daughter of the chieftain were wed under the shade of a candong tree in grandiose ceremonies.

During this wedding, a group of Spaniards, which included Captain Juan de Salcedo, passed by, and asked what was going on.  Natives thought they were asking for the name of the tree, so they uttered, "Candong." Candong in Spanish would be pronounced as Candon (pronounced Candong in regional Spanish dialects).

Another theory is that the place was named after the town of Candon in Spain.

History
According to the city archives, Malayan settlers were the first residents of Candon City that later turned into a village. Settlers were mostly farmers, fishermen, woodsmen and craftsmen. The Village was then ruled by three local chieftains: Abay-a, Madalang and Kalinio.  Madalang chose as his abode the shade of a gargantuan tree which stood in the center of the said village and under this large tree people converged to exchange pleasantries and goods. This is also where the elders and the chief settle disputes and offer advice. The Villagers named the large tree “Kandong”.

Upon the arrival of the Spanish colonizers in the 16th century, the symbolic tree was cut down upon orders of the friars and its lumber was used for the construction of the first Catholic Church in the area. The people were easily led into the new church and were converted to Catholicism.  The Spaniards named the place Candon from their version of the “Kandong” tree. The cemetery yard in the Catholic Church located south of the Poblacion area was constructed in 1797.  In 1780, the village was turned into a municipality. Under the Spanish rule, the village was quickly taken over by wealthy Spaniards employing the natives in conditions of near slavery. Famine occurred in 1881 and 1882. Then on March 25, 1898, a revolutionary government was declared and attacked the Spaniards. However, Spanish troops were able to re-occupy Candon 2 days later. Most of the leaders and participants of the uprising were arrested and then summarily executed.

During the Japanese occupation in 1942, another revolution was staged. Several truckloads of Japanese forces and supplies perished along the national highway.  However, the Japanese Soldiers retaliated back by burning the whole town in January 1942, which is considered the greatest event that ever happened in the history of Candon.
Despite the hardships that the townsfolk went through during the World Wars, residents were steadfast to go through the process of redemption and rebuilding.  And the tall acacia trees that now adorned the town plaza and municipal buildings are testimonies of the Candon's steadfastness.  Large trees now spans alongside the National Highway of the Poblacion which towers up to 15 meters high and 20 feet in circumference.

Cityhood

In the Charter of Candon City, Candon applied to become the second city in the Province of Ilocos Sur so it can undertake government programs with additional funding from the national government to benefit the people in the field of social services, economic growth, peace and order, health, education, agriculture and infrastructure development.

Like the "Kandong" tree of yore, Candon is just beginning to spread out its branches to reach out for the skies in its own bid to become the next city in Ilocos Sur. From the start of House Bill 7260 seeking to convert Candon into a component city was filed by then Congressman Eric D. Singson in the 10th Congress and later re-filed by Congresswoman Grace D. Singson in the 11th Congress. Owing to the merits and qualifications of Candon as the leading town in Southern Ilocos Sur, the bill easily got the approval of the Committees on Local Government in both House of Representatives and in the Senate.

Until recently the aspiration for Candon to become a city remained a dream, but its destiny inevitable when the counterpart Senate Bill No. 2242 was sponsored by no less than Senate President Aquilino "Nene" Pimentel Jr., Senators Frank Drilon, Sergio Osmeña III and all the members of the Senate Committee on Local Government. It was subsequently approved unanimously by the Senate in plenary session, and now it is up to the townspeople to embrace this honor with an equally unanimous "YES to Cityhood" vote.

Geography
Candon City is situated in the lower central portion of the Province of Ilocos Sur. It has a "C" shape with elevations ranging from 10 – 500 ft above sea level.

Barangays
Candon City is politically subdivided into 42 barangays. These barangays are headed by elected officials: Barangay Captain, Barangay Council, whose members are called Barangay Councilors. All are elected every three years.

 Allangigan 1st
 Allangigan 2nd
 Amguid
 Ayudante
 Bagani Campo
 Bagani Gabor
 Bagani Tocgo
 Bagani Ubbog
 Bagar
 Balingaoan
 Bugnay
 Calaoa-an
 Calongbuyan
 Caterman
 Cubcubbuot
 Darapidap
 Langlangca 1st
 Langlangca 2nd
 Oaig Daya
 Palacapac
 Paras
 Parioc 1st
 Parioc 2nd
 Patpata 1st
 Patpata 2nd
 Paypayad
 Salvador 1st
 Salvador 2nd
 San Agustin
 San Andres
 San Antonio (Poblacion)
 San Isidro (Poblacion)
 San Jose (Poblacion)
 San Juan (Poblacion)
 San Nicolas
 San Pedro
 Santo Tomas
 Tablac
 Talogtog
 Tamurong 1st
 Tamurong 2nd
 Villarica

Climate
The climate is generally dry that usually occurs from the months of October to May. However, the southernmost portion is observed to be humid and rain is evenly distributed throughout the year while the eastern part is dry with rain not sufficiently distributed. August has the most rainfall while January and February have the least. January is the coldest.

Demographics

Economy 

Candon City has a geographical setting and proximity to the national highway and other towns that encouraged greater mobility in terms of trade, economic, social and cultural activities. The Department of Trade and Industry termed the city as the "Center for Trade and Commerce" in Ilocos Sur.

Many adjacent towns frequent Candon for commercial activities, catering to the commercial needs of an estimated 100,000 population. The city also has a supermarket and shopping mall, banking and lending institutions, recreational facilities, tourism facilities, health and medical establishments.

Existing industries in Candon City are manufacturing, agro-industry and cottage industry. The manufacturing sector owns the Tobacco Stalk Cement Bonded Board Plant that produces particle boards for low cost housing and other construction needs. Other manufacturing establishments are based on calamay making, chichacorn (deep-fried corn), bakeshop/bakery, ice cream, and vinegar; furniture making, concrete products manufacturing, and a Coconut Oil Processing Plant located at Barangay Talogtog. On the other hand, cottage industries include balut egg production, fish re-drying, salt making, native delicacies, woodcraft and handicraft.

Service establishments are also present in Candon, such as sari-sari and grocery stores, carinderias (small diners), nightclubs, barber shops, beauty parlors, gasoline stations and stores/outlets for the following: auto parts, agricultural equipment and supplies, school and office supplies, photo and supplies, appliances, pharmaceuticals, hardware and electrical. There are also video centers, bazaars, gift shops, pawnshops and mineral/distilled drinking water store outlets, and real estate.

The city is the center of trade and commerce in the 2nd district of Ilocos Sur. Urban growth has a linear pattern along major thoroughfares in the city center and the national highway.

Transportation
Candon City is accessible via the McArthur National Highway, which is also the city's main thoroughfare. Other major streets in the city are 25 de Marzo Street and San Juan Street, both parallel to the National Highway. Quirino Boulevard is a secondary highway that connects the city proper to the upland barangays of Candon City and the upland municipalities of Ilocos Sur. The Darapidap Beach Road or the Samonte Boulevard where you can find the Muslim Mosque aside of it. This Road connects the seaside barangays to the urban center.

Tricycles and jeepneys are the major types of transportation in the city. There are over 3000 registered tricycles in the city, the highest number of registered tricycles in the province (as an individual local government unit.)

Buses provide long-distance trips to major cities like Manila, Baguio and Laoag. Mini-Buses provide short trips to neighboring municipalities and the nearby cities of Vigan and San Fernando, La Union. Major Bus Companies also established their terminals in the city, among them are:
 Partas
 Dominion Bus Lines
Santa Lucia Express and Martinez Trans (managed by Victory Liner)
Candon Bus Line

Education
North Luzon Philippines State College - Formerly a campus of the University of Northern Philippines, founded as the Candon Community College before its merger with UNP by virtue of a bill enacted by then Congressman Eric Singson
Saint Joseph Institute, Inc. - a co-ed private school owned and administered by the Sisters of St. Paul of Chartres
Candon National High School
Nicosat Colleges - private school that offers kindergarten to college curriculum

Tourism

 Candon Church (Saint John de Sahagun Parish Church)
 Darapidap Beach
 Tobacco Festival - Celebrated every month of March as thanksgiving for the city's vast harvest of tobacco
 Feria de Candon (Trade Fair)- Every first week of December in honor of Santa Barbara (December 4).

Government
Candon, belonging to the second congressional district of the province of Ilocos Sur, is governed by a mayor designated as its local chief executive and by a city council as its legislative body in accordance with the Local Government Code. The mayor, vice mayor, and the councilors are elected directly by the people through an election which is being held every three years.

Elected officials

City seal

The official seal of the City of Candon was approved and adopted by the Sangguniang Panlungsod under Resolution No. 017-01 sponsored by Councilor David Gacusana. It is published to immortalize the “Cry of Candon” of March 1898 and to commemorate the ratification of its Cityhood charter under Republic Act 9018 on March 28, 2001.

Explanatory notes:
 The seal is patterned after the Official Seal of Ilocos Sur, which is also the general pattern being used by all the seals of the different provinces in the Philippines.
 The emblem at the middle of the circle represents the Philippine Flag, which symbolizes the spirit of nationalism.
 The TORCH at the middle of the flag represents the spirit of 1898 demonstrating an ever-burning desire of our people for “liberty, justice and democracy.”
 The SABER and the RIFLE crossed below the torch are symbols of the readiness of the people to protect human rights. While the TOBACCO LEAVES behind them are like outstretched wings whereby the local agriculture economy thrives.
 The date on top of the glowing flame is the date of the immortal “Cry of Candon” when our forefathers, led by the indomitable Don Isabelo Abaya, fought and successfully liberated Candon from the Spanish overlords a full three months before the National uprising of June 12, 1898.
 Finally, the banner beneath the emblem contains the historic Candon City Charter – Republic Act 9018 of March 28, 2001, declaring Candon as a city.

Infrastructure
Candon City Sports Complex is an indoor arena located at Brgy. Bagani Campo. With an area of 960 square meters (24m by 40m) and a stage with an area of 600 square meters. Its capacity was 5,000 people. The basement level of the arena will serve as the parking area, stock room, mechanical and electrical room, maintenance room, and will also have a fire exit stairs and a room for toilets for both genders. The second floor will provide a space for another lobby, seating area, two restaurant areas, two common dining areas, four snack stands, control room (for light and sound), toilets for both genders, and a roof deck. The third floor will also have a lobby, two snack stands, seating area, and roof decks. Because of the COVID-19 pandemic, the construction will be completed by 2022. It will host some major sporting events including the Philippine Basketball Association.

Media

AM stations
DZTP 693 kHz Tirad Pass Broadcasting Network

FM stations
DWRE 104.5 Radyo Natin

Sister Cities
 Honolulu, Hawaii, United States
 Baguio, Philippines

References

External links

 
 [ Philippine Standard Geographic Code]
Philippine Census Information
Local Governance Performance Management System

Cities in Ilocos Sur
Populated places established in 1780
1780 establishments in the Philippines
Populated coastal places in the Philippines
Component cities in the Philippines